Sara Corfixsen Milthers (born 14 January 2002) is a Danish canoeist. She competed in the women's K-1 200 metres and the K-4 500 metres  events at the 2020 Summer Olympics.

References

External links
 

2002 births
Living people
Danish female canoeists
Canoeists at the 2020 Summer Olympics
Olympic canoeists of Denmark